Leaman Walter Johnson  (August 15, 1918 –  death date unknown) was an American baseball shortstop in the Negro leagues. He played from 1941 to 1950 with the Newark Eagles, New York Black Yankees, Birmingham Black Barons, St. Louis Stars, Harlem Globetrotters, Memphis Red Sox, Los Angeles White Sox, Detroit Senators and Cincinnati Crescents.


References

External links
 and Seamheads

Newark Eagles players
New York Black Yankees players
Memphis Red Sox players
Birmingham Black Barons players
Los Angeles White Sox players
Cincinnati Crescents players
1918 births
Year of death missing
Date of death unknown
Baseball infielders